Streptomyces caeruleatus is a bacterium species from the genus of Streptomyces which has been isolated from rhizosphere soil from a tomato plant in Guangzhou in China.

See also 
 List of Streptomyces species

References

Further reading

External links
Type strain of Streptomyces caeruleatus at BacDive – the Bacterial Diversity Metadatabase

caeruleatus
Bacteria described in 2011